The Meyerowitz Stories (New and Selected) is a 2017 American comedy-drama film directed and written by Noah Baumbach. The film stars Adam Sandler, Ben Stiller, Dustin Hoffman, Elizabeth Marvel and Emma Thompson, and follows a group of dysfunctional adult siblings trying to live in the shadow of their father.

The Meyerowitz Stories was selected to compete for the Palme d'Or in the main competition section and also won the Palm Dog award at the 2017 Cannes Film Festival. It received positive reviews from critics, who praised Baumbach's script and direction as well as the performances, with Sandler especially singled out for praise. It was released in theaters and on streaming by Netflix on October 13, 2017.

The film was the second Netflix film competing at Cannes, along with Okja, which caused a clash with the jury president Pedro Almodóvar, who sided with the opinion that Cannes Film Festival films should be made for big screens, not online streaming. In 2017, the Cannes Film Festival announced a new rule, which requires a film competing at Cannes to "commit itself to being distributed in French movie theatres". A French law mandates that films cannot be shown on streaming services for 36 months after their theatrical release, effectively blocking Netflix films from future festivals.

Plot
After separating from his wife, unemployed Danny Meyerowitz moves in with father Harold, a retired Bard College art professor and sculptor, and his fourth wife, Maureen, a pleasant if foggy hippy. Jean is his sister, and they have a younger half-brother, Matthew. Danny is close to his daughter, Eliza, a freshman film student at Bard. Eliza shows one of her sexually provocative films to the family, who try hard not to show their shock and instead compliment its energy and production value.

Some of Harold's work has been selected as part of a faculty group show at Bard, but he refuses to be part of a group show. Danny and Harold attend the MoMA retrospective of a friend and contemporary of Harold's, the successful L.J. Shapiro. There neither father nor son feels comfortable; Harold feels the art world has forgotten him and chooses to literally run away down the street. Danny meets Shapiro's daughter, his childhood friend Loretta, but is forced to leave to chase after Harold.

Harold's younger son Matthew, a successful financial advisor to rock stars on the west coast in Los Angeles, is in New York on business and meets Harold for lunch with an accountant friend. They try to convince Harold to sell his Manhattan home and its sculpture, as he can barely pay the townhouse's utilities. Harold tells them the decision to sell the house is a private family decision and stalks out. At a third restaurant he criticizes the prices, but orders lavishly once Matthew says he'll pay.

During lunch at the restaurant, Harold feels offended by the arrogant manner of another patron, and gets Matthew to intervene in scene involving running, chasing and embarrassment. They bond slightly in self-righteous indignation. That evening they pay a visit to Matthew's mother, Harold's second wife Julia, who has since married a man named Cody, a wealthy philistine. She tells them she is sorry she was not a better mother to Harold's three children; her directness makes them very uncomfortable and they are anxious to leave. Matthew resents Harold for preferring a life of art over money. "I beat you!", he screams at his father's departing Volvo.

Harold is diagnosed with a chronic subdural hematoma. He enters the hospital, where as the days pass his children learn to manage his care themselves, after first leaning on Harold's doctor and nurse to do it. Outside the hospital Jean tells her brothers the family friend who happens to be visiting Harold at the moment exposed himself and masturbated in front of her when she was a child. Matthew and Danny let her walk away from them, then attack the friend's car with mounting exhilaration.

At Bard to represent their father at the faculty group show, Matthew and Danny get into a fight, of sorts, on the quad; later, bloody and crying, each makes drug-addled remarks in Harold's place, mostly about themselves, and Matthew ends up breaking down emotionally during his speech. As Harold convalesces at Maureen's place in the country (the townhouse was sold, despite Matthew's change of heart), it dawns on Matthew and Harold that Harold's favorite sculpture "Matthew", a lifelong object of resentment for Danny and Jean, was likely based on his feelings for young Danny.

Danny, who up to now has been solicitous toward his father, refuses to care for him while Maureen is away and accepts his brother's offer of a trip to California, but he forgives him for his past failures as a dad. On the way to the flight he meets Loretta, now single, and she suggests they go together to the screening of a film Eliza has made. In the basement of The Whitney, Eliza uncovers her grandfather's sculpture, long believed to have been lost. The slow pullback of the final camera shot shows how the Whitney Museum warehouse is full of "un-harolded" works by obscure artists.

Cast  
 Adam Sandler as Danny Meyerowitz, Harold's first son.  After separating from his wife he moved in with his father. Unemployed but musically gifted.
 Ben Stiller as Matthew Meyerowitz, Danny's half-brother and Harold's son. A successful financier who lives across the country and is currently separated from his wife, who he suspects has a new boyfriend.
 Dustin Hoffman as Harold Meyerowitz, a moderately successful sculptor and retired college professor. Has been married four times, although the first marriage was annulled.
 Emma Thompson as Maureen, Harold's fourth wife, an alcoholic hippy.
 Elizabeth Marvel as Jean Meyerowitz, Danny's sister and Matthew's half-sister. Harold's daughter. Works for Xerox. 
 Grace Van Patten as Eliza Meyerowitz, Danny's daughter. A film student who makes provocative short films.
 Candice Bergen as Julia, Harold's third wife and Matthew's mother. 
 Adam Driver as Randy, one of Matthew's clients.
 Sigourney Weaver as herself.
 Judd Hirsch as L.J. Shapiro, a successful artist and Harold's old friend.
 Rebecca Miller as Loretta Shapiro, L.J.'s daughter.
 Matthew Shear as Gabe, Matthew's colleague.
 Jared Sandler as college kid.

Production 
Principal photography on the film began on March 7, 2016 in New York City. Hospital footage was filmed at Phelps Memorial Hospital Center in Sleepy Hollow, New York and Lenox Hill Hospital in Manhattan. The scenes of Bard College were actually filmed at Sarah Lawrence College in Bronxville, NY. Production concluded on May 9, 2016.

During production, the film was known by the working title Yeh Din Ka Kissa, "The Tale of This Day" in Hindi.

Release

In April 2017, Netflix acquired distribution rights to the film. It had its world premiere at the Cannes Film Festival on May 21, 2017, where it received a four-minute standing ovation.

The film was released in select theaters and streaming on Netflix on October 13, 2017.

Although Netflix does not publicly disclose box office results of its films, IndieWire estimated that The Meyerowitz Stories made around $20,000 in its opening weekend, a figure the site noted as impressive considering it was released simultaneously streaming.

Critical response
On the review aggregator Rotten Tomatoes, the film holds an approval rating of 93% based on 188 reviews, and an average rating of 7.7/10. The website's critical consensus reads, "The Meyerowitz Stories (New and Selected) observes the family dynamic through writer-director Noah Baumbach's bittersweet lens and the impressive efforts of a remarkable cast." On Metacritic, the film has a weighted average score of 79 out of 100, based on 41 critics, indicating "generally favorable reviews".

Richard Roeper of Chicago Sun-Times gave the film 3.5 out of 4 stars and praised the cast and script, saying: "They’re a smart and sophisticated and relatively privileged bunch, but they’re miserable and ridiculous, which makes for some poignant insights and some sharp comedy. We enjoy the Meyerowitz clan, even as we praise the heavens we’re not like them and we don’t live next door to any of ’em." Writing for Rolling Stone, Peter Travers also gave the film 3.5 out of 4 stars, writing, "Noah Baumbach's funny, literate story gives Dustin Hoffman, Adam Sandler and Ben Stiller plum roles – and may be the best thing he's ever done."

Peter Debruge of Variety gave the film a positive review, calling it the best Netflix film to date and praising Sandler's performance, writing: "With no shtick to fall back on, Sandler is forced to act, and it’s a glorious thing to watcheven for those fans who like him best in perpetual man-child mode (don’t worry: the character is a full-grown variation on that familiar Sandler prototype)." Other critics were equal with their praise of Sandler, with various outlets calling his performance a "triumph," "miraculously great" and that "it's time to admit that Adam Sandler is actually a good actor."

Accolades

References

External links 
 
 
 
 The Meyerowitz Stories at Netflix

2017 films
2017 comedy-drama films
2017 independent films
American comedy-drama films
American independent films
English-language Netflix original films
Films about academia
Films about child sexual abuse
Films about dysfunctional families
Films about Jews and Judaism
Films directed by Noah Baumbach
Films produced by Scott Rudin
Films scored by Randy Newman
Films set in New York City
Films set in New York (state)
Films set in universities and colleges
Films shot in New York City
2010s English-language films
2010s American films